Chinnamanaickenpalayam is a village in the Sulur Taluk of Coimbatore district, Tamil Nadu, India.

Location 
The village of Chinnamanaickenpalayam is situated at coordinates , and is approximately 49 km from the Coimbatore Central Bus Station in Gandhipuram, 44 km from the Tiruppur Old Bus Stand, and 29 km from the Palladam Bus Station. The Thirumoorthy Dam is located 43 km away and the Amaravathi Dam is 48 km from the village. The nearest railway station is the Tiruppur Junction and the closest airport, the Coimbatore International Airport, is 49.3 km away.

Occupation 
Main occupation is Agriculture and the other businesses in this region are poultry farming, copra drying process, power loom weaving and Coconut/Coir Fibre manufacturing.

Transport 
Tiruppur old bus stand and Palladam bus stand can be reachable from Chinnamanaickenpalayam by public transport bus services.

Tiruppur to Senjeriputhur mofussil. 
 7:00am towards Senjeriputhur
 7:30am towards Tiruppur
 6:10pm towards Senjeriputhur
 7:00pm towards Tiruppur

Palladam to J.Krishnapuram p16 town bus. 
 9:05am towards J.Krishnapuram
 9:45am towards Palladam
 2:40pm towards J.Krishnapuram
 3:15pm towards Palladam

References 

Villages in Coimbatore district